Giletti is a surname of Italian origin. Notable people with the surname include:

Alain Giletti (born 1939), French figure skater
Emilio Giletti (1929–2020), Italian racing driver
Massimo Giletti (born 1962), Italian television host and journalist

Italian-language surnames